Bungama is a locality to the east of Port Pirie in the Mid North region of South Australia. It contains the intersection that is the southern entrance to Port Pirie from the Augusta Highway (Highway 1)) onto Warnertown Road, and is bisected by the Adelaide-Port Augusta railway line. It also contains a regional 275kV electricity substation operated by ElectraNet. Bungama is on the plains to the west of the Southern Flinders Ranges.

The locality was named after the now-unused railway station on the railway from Adelaide to Port Pirie. The station was given a local Aboriginal name meaning good.

References

Mid North (South Australia)
Towns in South Australia